is a Japanese anime television film produced by Studio Pierrot.
An adaptation of the 1989 novel Kōkyū Shōsetsu by Ken'ichi Sakemi.
It was broadcast on the Nippon Television Network System on March 21, 1990 (Vernal Equinox Day).

Production 
Like the Clouds, Like the Wind is an anime adaptation of Ken'ichi Sakemi's debut novel Kōkyū Shōsetsu, which won the first grand prize of the Japan Fantasy Novel Award, and was produced and broadcast as part of the 20th anniversary project of Mitsui Real Estate Sales Co., Ltd. (now Mitsui Fudosan Realty Co., Ltd.).

The film had its premier broadcast on March 21, 1990, during the vernal equinox national holiday, and was shown in an unprecedented commercial-free presentation. 
It was released on VHS video and laserdisc shortly after broadcast, and on Region 2 DVD in 2002. Then it was released on Blu-ray in HD remastered video in 2021.

For the anime adaptation, the characters' settings were changed and some episodes and descriptions were omitted in consideration of the wide age range of viewers.

Many staff members involved in the Studio Ghibli productions of the time, including Katsuya Kondō, who designed characters for Kiki's Delivery Service, participated in the production of the film, and its distinctive visuals were talked about in Japan at the time as being reminiscent of Ghibli.
It was for some time inaccurately understood to be produced by Studio Ghibli outside Japan, due to the presence of Ghibli staff and the first fan translation mistaking screenwriter Akira Miyazaki for Hayao Miyazaki.

Kumo Kaze, as it is sometimes called, is currently licensed in North America by Discotek Media who subsequently released it on DVD and Blu-ray.

Story
Set in a fictional country dynasty reminiscent of early 17th century China, the story follows the strange fate of Ginga, a young girl who volunteers to be the wife of the new emperor.

Ginga is a simple—yet energetic—country girl, living with her father far from the capital city of the empire. When she learns of an opportunity to become a concubine of the young new Emperor, with the possibility of getting a regular food supply in the bargain, Ginga convinces her father to let her go. Once there, she meets all of the other potential head wives, each of whom have various reasons for being there. All of them must learn to read and write, learn the history of their country, and learn the proper mannerisms for being in the royal court.

Ginga's enthusiasm tends to get her in trouble more often than not, but it works to her advantage when they learn that the former emperor's head wife, who is not the mother of the current emperor, is plotting treachery against the new emperor, and that a rebellion is headed toward the capital.

Cast

Ginga: Ryōko Sano
Koryūn: Emiya Ichikawa
Kōyō: Yō Inoue
Seshaamin: Yōko Asagami
Tamyūn: Atsuko Takahata
Kakuto: Kinto Tamura
Kikkyō: Yūji Mitsuya
Iryūda (Heishō): Nobuaki Fukuda
Konton: Akiji Kobayashi
Empress Kin: Ikuko Tani
Taruto-baba: Hisako Kyōda
Mano: Kōichi Kitamura
Ino: Yōsuke Akimoto
Narrator: Tadashi Nakamura
Atsushi Ii
Tomie Kataoka
Eken Mine
Tetsuo Mizutori
Midori Nakazawa
Akemi Shinohara
Masaaki Tsukada
Akiko Yajima

Music 
The film score was composed by Haruhiko Maruya.

Theme song
Kumo no yō ni Kaze no yō ni
Lyrics: Anju Mana
Composed by: Tetsurō Kugizaki
Arranged by: Etsuko Yamakawa
Vocals: Ryōko Sano

References

External links
 Studio Pierrot (official site)
 VAP Video (official site)

 Nausicaa.net
 
 Anime News Network "Hidden Treasures" review

Japanese animated films
1990 anime films
1990 anime television series debuts
1990s animated television specials
Anime films based on novels
Anime and manga based on novels
Alternate history anime and manga
Drama anime and manga
Fantasy anime and manga
Historical anime and manga
Historical fantasy anime and manga
Romance anime and manga
Alternate history anime
Works set in fictional countries
Television series set in fictional countries
Pierrot (company)
Nippon TV original programming
Discotek Media